|}

This is a list of electoral district results for the Victorian 1932 election.

Results by electoral district

Albert Park

Allandale

Ballarat

Barwon

Benalla

Benambra

Bendigo 

 Two party preferred vote was estimated.

Boroondara

Brighton

Brunswick

Bulla and Dalhousie

Carlton

Castlemaine and Kyneton

Caulfield

Clifton Hill

Coburg 

 Two party preferred vote was estimated.

Collingwood

Dandenong

Dundas

Essendon

Evelyn

Flemington 

 Two party preferred vote was estimated.

Footscray

Geelong

Gippsland East

Gippsland North

Gippsland South

Gippsland West

Goulburn Valley

Grant

Gunbower

Hampden

Hawthorn

Heidelberg

Kara Kara and Borung

Kew

Korong and Eaglehawk

Lowan

Maryborough and Daylesford

Melbourne 

 Two party preferred vote was estimated.

Mildura 

 Two party preferred vote was estimated.

Mornington 

 Preferences were not distributed.

Northcote

Nunawading

Oakleigh

Ouyen

Polwarth

Port Fairy and Glenelg 

 Preferences were not distributed.

Port Melbourne

Prahran

Richmond

Rodney

St Kilda

Stawell and Ararat

Swan Hill

Toorak

Upper Goulburn

Upper Yarra

Walhalla 

 Two party preferred vote was estimated.

Wangaratta and Ovens

Waranga

Warrenheip and Grenville

Warrnambool

Williamstown 

 Preferences were not distributed.

Wonthaggi 

 Two party preferred vote was estimated.

See also 

 1932 Victorian state election
 Candidates of the 1932 Victorian state election
 Members of the Victorian Legislative Assembly, 1932–1935

References 

Results of Victorian state elections
1930s in Victoria (Australia)